San Jacinto Amilpas  is a town and municipality in Oaxaca in south-western Mexico. The municipality covers an area of 12.76 km². 
It is part of the Centro District in the Valles Centrales region.
As of 2005, the municipality had a total population of 10,100.

References

Municipalities of Oaxaca